is a former Japanese football player.

Playing career
Tsuda was born in Machida on July 26, 1982. After graduating from high school, he joined J1 League club Shimizu S-Pulse in 2001. Although he played 3 matches in 2002–03 AFC Champions League, he could hardly play in the match until 2003. In 2004, he moved to J2 League club Ventforet Kofu. However he could hardly play in the match. In 2005, he moved to Prefectural Leagues club FC Machida Zelvia based in his local. He played as regular left side back and center back from first season and the club was promoted to Regional Leagues from 2006, Japan Football League from 2009 and J2 from 2012. He retired end of 2012 season.

Club statistics

References

External links

1982 births
Living people
Association football people from Tokyo
Japanese footballers
J1 League players
J2 League players
Japan Football League players
Shimizu S-Pulse players
Ventforet Kofu players
FC Machida Zelvia players
Association football defenders